Nathan Lewis is the name of:

Nathan Lewis (chemist), American chemist
Nathan Lewis (footballer), Trinidadian footballer
Nate Lewis, American football player for the Chicago Bears